Ru, ru, or RU may refer to:

 Russia 
 Russia (ISO 3166-1 alpha-2 country code)
 Russian language (ISO 639 alpha-2 code)
 .ru, the Internet country code top-level domain for Russia

 China 
 Rù (入), the entering tone in Chinese language phonetics
 Rú (儒), a Chinese language term for Confucianism
 Ru (surname) (茹), a Chinese surname
 Ru River (汝), in Henan, China
 Ru ware, a type of Chinese pottery

 Educational institutions 
 Radboud University Nijmegen, in Nijmegen, Netherlands
 Radford University, in Virginia, USA
 Rai University in Gujarat, India
 Rajshahi University in Bangladesh
 Rama University in India
 Ramkhamhaeng University in Thailand
 Regis University in Colorado, USA
 Reykjavík University Iceland
 Rhodes University in Grahamstown, South Africa
 Rockefeller University in New York, USA 
 Rockhurst University in Missouri, USA
 Roosevelt University in Chicago, Illinois, USA
 Rowan University in New Jersey, USA
 Ruse University in Bulgaria
 Rutgers University in New Jersey, USA
 Ryerson University, the former name of Toronto Metropolitan University in Ontario, Canada

 Science and technology 
 Resource Unit, a unit used in 802.11 wireless
 Rack unit, a measurement of the height electronic equipment installed in 19-inch racks
 Ruthenium, symbol Ru, a chemical element
 The "backwards-R U" Recognized Component Mark of Underwriters Laboratories

 Other uses 
 Reino Unido, the Spanish name of the United Kingdom
 Royaume-Uni, the French name of the United Kingdom
 Regno Unito, the Italian name of the United Kingdom
 Ru (kana), the romanisation of the Japanese kana る and ル
 Ru (cuneiform), a sign in cuneiform writing
 Ru (novel), a novel by Canadian novelist Kim ThúyRückkehr unerwünscht'' "return unwanted", a Nazi designation for concentration camp prisoners who were forbidden to be released
 RuPaul, an American drag queen, actor, and television personality 
 Rugby union
 AirBridge Cargo (IATA airline code)

See also
Rew (disambiguation)
Rewe (disambiguation)
Roo (disambiguation)
Rou (disambiguation)
Rue (disambiguation)
Ruu